Stenestad is a village in Svalöv Municipality in southern Sweden. The Norra Vram circuit for the 1933 Swedish Summer Grand Prix went through the village.

Populated places in Skåne County